Luanne Miller Van Werven (born 1957) is an American politician from Washington. Van Werven is a former Republican member of Washington House of Representatives for District 42. Van Werven served from January 12, 2015 to January 11, 2021.  She was elected vice chair of the Washington State Republican Party in January 2013 and served as interim chair from July to August later that year, when she lost the position to Susan Hutchison. She previously served as chair of the Republican Party in Whatcom County.

In the 2017–2018 Legislative Year, Van Werven sponsored HB 1775, which would prohibit abortion after 20 weeks of gestation. This act would be known and cited as the "Washington pain capable unborn child protection act". The bill was never voted on.

References

External links 
 Luanne Van Werven at ballotpedia.org

1957 births
Living people
People from Lynden, Washington
State political party chairs of Washington (state)
Republican Party members of the Washington House of Representatives
Women state legislators in Washington (state)
21st-century American politicians
21st-century American women politicians